Alysbeth Félix Boyer (born March 7, 1993) is a Puerto Rican athlete competing in the heptathlon. Earlier in her career she specialised in the high jump and long jump.

Competition record

Personal bests
Outdoor
200 metres – 24.37 (-2.7 m/s, Medellín 2015)
800 metres – 2:16.04 (Rio de Janeiro 2016)
100 metres hurdles – 13.53 (+1.7 m/s, Medellín 2016)
High jump – 1.81 (Medellín 2016)
Long jump – 6.33 (-0.4 m/s, Xalapa 2014)
Triple jump – 12.39 (+0.6 m/s, Ponce 2014)
Shot put – 11.35 (Rio de Janeiro 2016)
Javelin throw – 39.38 (Toronto 2015)
Heptathlon – 5910 (Rio de Janeiro 2016)

References

Living people
1993 births
Puerto Rican heptathletes
Puerto Rican female long jumpers
Puerto Rican female track and field athletes
Pan American Games competitors for Puerto Rico
Athletes (track and field) at the 2015 Pan American Games
Athletes (track and field) at the 2019 Pan American Games
Olympic track and field athletes of Puerto Rico
Athletes (track and field) at the 2016 Summer Olympics
Central American and Caribbean Games bronze medalists for Puerto Rico
Competitors at the 2010 Central American and Caribbean Games
Competitors at the 2014 Central American and Caribbean Games
Competitors at the 2018 Central American and Caribbean Games
Central American and Caribbean Games medalists in athletics
21st-century American women